Willem Hubert van Blijenburgh (11 July 1881 – 14 October 1936) was a Dutch fencer. He won three bronze medals.

References

External links
 

1881 births
1936 deaths
Dutch male fencers
Olympic fencers of the Netherlands
Fencers at the 1906 Intercalated Games
Fencers at the 1908 Summer Olympics
Fencers at the 1912 Summer Olympics
Fencers at the 1920 Summer Olympics
Fencers at the 1924 Summer Olympics
Olympic bronze medalists for the Netherlands
Olympic medalists in fencing
Sportspeople from Zwolle
Medalists at the 1912 Summer Olympics
Medalists at the 1920 Summer Olympics
20th-century Dutch people